Muhammad Nasirudeen Maiturare (born 16 June 1963) is a Nigerian academic, a professor of business administration. He is the fourth substantive Vice-Chancellor of Ibrahim Badamasi Babangida University, Lapai in Nigeria.

Early life and education
Muhammad Nasirudeen Maiturare was born in Paiko, a small town in Paikoro Local Government Area, of Niger State, in Nigeria. He grew up there and went to Bida Government College for his Secondary School Education where he had his Secondary school leaving certificate. In 1980.  In 1982 he later did (IJMB) at the School of Basic Studies and proceeded to Ahmadu Bello University, Zaria.  For his BSc Actuarial Science in 1985 and M.B.A. in 1989, and 2001 he bagged his PhD in Business Administration in same institution. In pursuit of knowledge he went to Federal University of Technology, Minna to be trained as a Computer Analyst.

Career
He begins his career at Ministry of Finance, Akure, Onto between 1985 and 1986. He has worked as a lecturer at Federal Polytechnic, Bida, from 1986 to 1987. He also work in Ahmadu Bello University, Zaria, in 1987. he has taught several courses at undergraduate, Masters, and PhD levels. In 2010 he became a Professor of Business Administration, ABU, Zaria, during his Sabbatical leave, between January and December 2013 he worked with the National Pension Commission.

Personal life
Maiturare is married and with children.

References

External links 
 

1963 births
Living people
Academic staff of Ibrahim Badamasi Babangida University
Vice-Chancellors of Nigerian universities
Federal University of Technology, Minna alumni
Ahmadu Bello University alumni
People from Niger State
Academic staff of the Federal Polytechnic Bida